Jessamyn West may refer to:

 Jessamyn West (writer) (1902–1984), American writer
 Jessamyn West (librarian) (born 1968), American librarian and blogger